The Walking Stick is a 1967 thriller novel by the British writer Winston Graham.

Adaptation
In 1970 the story was turned into a film of the same title directed by Eric Till and starring David Hemmings and Samantha Eggar.

References

Bibliography
 Goble, Alan. The Complete Index to Literary Sources in Film. Walter de Gruyter, 1999.

1967 British novels
Novels by Winston Graham
British thriller novels
British novels adapted into films
Novels set in London
William Collins, Sons books